Yale Nance Patt is an American professor of electrical and computer engineering at The University of Texas at Austin.  He holds the Ernest Cockrell, Jr. Centennial Chair in Engineering. In 1965, Patt introduced the WOS module, the first complex logic gate implemented on a single piece of silicon. He is a fellow of both the Institute of Electrical and Electronics Engineers and the Association for Computing Machinery, and in 2014 he was elected to the National Academy of Engineering.

Patt received his bachelor's degree at Northeastern University and his master's degree and doctorate  at Stanford University, all in electrical engineering. His doctoral advisor was Richard Mattson.

Patt has spent much of his career pursuing aggressive ILP, out-of-order, and speculative computer architectures, such as HPSm, the High Performance Substrate for Microprocessors.

Patt is also the co-author of the textbook, Introduction to Computing Systems: From Bits and Gates to C and Beyond, currently published in its third edition by McGraw-Hill, which is used as the course textbook for his undergraduate Introduction to Computing class at University of Texas at Austin as well as the introduction Computer Engineering course at University of Illinois at Urbana Champaign, Introduction to Computer Systems at University of Pennsylvania and Computer Organization and Programming at Georgia Institute of Technology and Introduction to Computer Engineering at University of Wisconsin Madison. It is in this textbook that the LC-3 Assembly Language is introduced.

In 2009, Patt received an honorary doctorate from the University of Belgrade.

Teaching
1966–1967 Cornell University
1969–1976 North Carolina State University,  Assistant Professor of Electrical Engineering
1976–1988 San Francisco State University, Professor of Computer Science and Mathematics
1979–1988 University of California-Berkeley, Adjunct Professor of Computer Science
1988–1999 University of Michigan, Professor of Computer Science and Engineering
1999–present University of Texas, Professor of Electrical and Computer Engineering

Awards
1995 IEEE Emanuel R. Piore Award "for contributions to computer architecture leading to commercially viable high performance microprocessors"
1996 IEEE/ACM Eckert-Mauchly Award "for important contributions to instruction level parallelism and superscalar processor design"
1999 IEEE Wallace W. McDowell Award "for your impact on the high performance microprocessor industry via a combination of important contributions to both engineering and education"
2005 IEEE Computer Society Charles Babbage Award "for fundamental contributions to high performance processor design"
2014 Elected to the National Academy of Engineering "for contributions to high-performance microprocessor architecture"
2016 Benjamin Franklin Medal in Computer and Cognitive Science "for his pioneering contributions to the design of modern microprocessors that achieve higher performance by automatically identifying computer instructions that can be performed simultaneously"

References

External links
One Page Autobiographical Sketch
Official UT ECE Page
Yale Patt's Home Page

Introduction to Computing: From Bits and Gates to C and Beyond

Members of the United States National Academy of Engineering
University of Texas at Austin faculty
Northeastern University alumni
Stanford University alumni
Cornell University faculty
Living people
Year of birth missing (living people)
American electrical engineers
Fellows of the Association for Computing Machinery
Fellow Members of the IEEE
University of Michigan faculty